Allan Kamanga (born 29 December 1981) is a Malawian footballer who currently plays for Dynamos. In 2020, he retired from playing football

International career
Kamanga is part of the Malawi national football team and represented his team at the 2010 African Cup of Nations.

References

1981 births
Living people
Malawian footballers
Malawi international footballers
2010 Africa Cup of Nations players
Expatriate soccer players in South Africa
Malawian expatriate sportspeople in South Africa
Malawian expatriate footballers
Black Leopards F.C. players
Expatriate footballers in Zimbabwe
Mighty Wanderers FC players
Mpumalanga Black Aces F.C. players
Association football defenders
Dynamos F.C. (South Africa) players